Friedrich Janke (born 19 April 1931) is a German long-distance runner. He competed in the 5000 metres at the 1956 Summer Olympics and the 1960 Summer Olympics.

References

External links
 

1931 births
Living people
Athletes (track and field) at the 1956 Summer Olympics
Athletes (track and field) at the 1960 Summer Olympics
German male long-distance runners
Olympic athletes of the United Team of Germany
Place of birth missing (living people)
20th-century German people